And Now... The Runaways is the fourth and final studio album by American rock band The Runaways, released in Europe on 16 December 1978 and Japan in 1979.

About the album 
This was The Runaways last album before disbanding. The album was issued by Cherry Red Records in the UK and was not released in the United States in 1978.  In 1981, Rhino Records re-issued it as a picture disc and a cassette tape under the title Little Lost Girls, with a different cover photo and a different sequence of the songs.

At the beginning of the recording sessions, Vicki Blue left the band and the bass lines on the tracks are actually played by Lita Ford. During the tumultuous recording of the album, manager Toby B. Mamis observed producer John Alcock's attempts to ultimately phase Joan Jett out of the proceedings, hence Sandy West and Lita Ford's individual solo spots (Sandy's with "Right Now", which she wrote and sang lead on, and Lita's "I'm a Million", featuring Ford's very first lead vocal on record). Joan later quipped, "I had a funny feeling I was about to get fired from a band that I helped create." Duane Hitchings is thanked in the credits for his work on keyboards.

"Black Leather" is a song originally written by ex-Sex Pistols members Steve Jones and Paul Cook for their former band.

Soon after hiring new bassist Laurie McAllister, Jett and Ford jointly dissolved the Runaways, citing musical differences within the group. Ford and West then attempted to start a new, harder band with Alcock producing, but nothing became of these sessions.

Track listing

And Now... The Runaways

Little Lost Girls

Personnel 
The Runaways
 Joan Jett - rhythm guitar, lead and backing vocals
 Lita Ford - lead guitar, all bass, backing vocals, lead vocals on "I'm a Million"
 Sandy West - drums, backing vocals, lead vocals on "Right Now"
 Vicki Blue - bass, backing vocals (only credited, did not perform on the record)

Production
 John Alcock - producer
 Will Reid Dick - engineer
 A. Wally - assistant engineer
 Ken Perry - mastering at Capitol Studios, Hollywood, California
 David Larkham - sleeve design and direction
 Barry Levine - photography

References

The Runaways albums
1978 albums
Cherry Red Records albums
Mercury Records albums